Are U Xperienced? is the debut and only studio album by American hip hop duo Yomo & Maulkie. It was named after the Jimi Hendrix 1967 album Are You Experienced. It was released on September 17, 1991 via Eazy-E's Ruthless Records, and was produced by DJ Yella. Though the album was met with some positive reviews, it was a commercial failure and did not appear on any album charts. Three singles were released: "Mama Don't", "Mockingbird", "Glory"/"Are U Xperienced?", but the only single "Glory" made it to the Billboard charts, peaking at number 7 on the Hot Rap Songs. Labelmates Jimmy Z and Jewell Caples were featured on the album.

Parts of the song "For the Love of Money" (including Jewell's backing vocals) were later recycled on the track "Foe tha Love of $" by Bone Thugs-n-Harmony, from their 1994 extended play album Creepin on ah Come Up. The instrumental version of "For the Love of Money" also appeared on Creepin on ah Come Up under the title "Moe Cheese".

Track listing

Sample credits
Track 3 contains elements from "Cramp Your Style" by All the People & Robert Moore (1972), "Movin'" by Brass Construction (1975), "Uphill Peace of Mind" by Kid Dynamite (1976), "Fantastic Freaks at the Dixie" by DJ Grand Wizard Theodore and The Fantastic Five (1983), "AJ Scratch" by Kurtis Blow (1984)
Track 4 contains elements from "Funky Drummer" by James Brown (1970), "Different Strokes" by Syl Johnson (1967), "Kool Is Back" by Funk, Inc. (1971), "UFO" by ESG (1981), "Scratchin'" by The Magic Disco Machine (1975)
Track 5 contains elements from "I've Been Watching You (Move Your Sexy Body)" by Parliament (1976)
Track 7 contains elements from "EXP" by Jimi Hendrix (1967), "Jungle Boogie" by Kool & the Gang (1973)
Track 8 contains elements from "Whatcha See Is Whatcha Get" by The Dramatics (1971)
Track 9 contains elements from "God Make Me Funky" by The Headhunters & Pointer Sisters (1975), "Stone to the Bone" by James Brown (1973)
Track 10 contains elements from "Hook and Sling - Part I" by Eddie Bo (1969), "Let a Woman Be a Woman, Let a Man Be a Man" by Dyke & the Blazers (1969), "Moog Power" by Hugo Montenegro (1969), "Bring the Noise" by Public Enemy (1987)
Track 11 contains elements from "Different Strokes" by Syl Johnson (1967)
Track 13 contains elements from "Good Times" by Chic (1979)

Personnel
Yomo Craig Smith – main artist/performer
Mark Eric Green – main artist/performer
Jewell Caples – backing vocals (tracks: 5, 8)
James Zavala – saxophone (track 9)
Nate Morgan – piano
Mike "Crazy Neck" Sims – bass & guitar
Antoine Carraby – producer
Eric Wright – executive producer
Donovan "The Dirt Biker" Sound – engineering
Brian Knapp Gardner – mastering
Bob Defrin – art direction
Jodi Rovin – design
Peter Dokus – photography
Jerry Heller – management

References

External links

1991 debut albums
Ruthless Records albums
Albums produced by DJ Yella
Atlantic Records albums